Augusto Cury (born October 2, 1958) is a Brazilian physician, psychiatrist, psychotherapist and writer. He developed the Multifocal Theory, about the functioning of the mind and the construction process of thought. His books have sold over 30 million copies in his country and is Brazil's most read author.

He is a researcher in the field of quality of life and development of intelligence, addressing the nature, construction and dynamics of emotion and thoughts. He develops researches in Spain in Educational Sciences in the area of quality of life. Published in more than 40 countries, Cury lectured at the BYU University's 13th International Conference on Intolerance and Discrimination, in the US. He's doctor honoris causa by UNIFIL (Centro Universitário Filadélfia in Londrina), and member of honor of the Academy of Gifted People of the Intelligence Institute, in the city of Porto, Portugal.
In March 2008, was created the Augusto Cury's Study Centre (Centro de Estudos Augusto Cury, in Portuguese), in Portugal, integrated in the Intelligence Institute from that country.

Biography 
He was born in Colina, São Paulo, on October 2, 1958. He graduated in medicine from the Faculty of São José do Rio Preto and devoted himself to research the dynamics of emotion.

His books in the field of psychology have sold more than 25 million copies in Brazil alone, having been published in more than 70 countries. Cury was considered the most read Brazilian author of the decade by the Folha de S. Paulo newspaper.

Theory of Multifocal Intelligence 
As a researcher in the area of quality of life and development of intelligence, Cury developed researches unrelated to universities focused on the theory of Multifocal Intelligence. The theory aims to explain the functioning of the human mind and the ways to exercise more dominion over our life through intelligence and thought.

He published "Multifocal Intelligence" in 1999, where he presents more than 30 essential elements for the formation of human intelligence, such as the process of interpretation and the vital flow of psychic energy

Bibliography 
(Some of the titles here were translated literally and aren't necessarily with their titles of their English versions)

 Inteligência Multifocal (Multifocal Intelligence) - April 16, 1999
 A Pior Prisão do Mundo (The Worst Prison of The World) - 2000
 Escola da Vida: Harry Potter no Mundo Real (Life's School: Harry Potter in The Real World) - January 1, 2002
 Você é Insubstituível (You Are Irreplaceable) - April 22, 2002
 Revolucione Sua Qualidade de Vida (Revolutionize Your Life Quality) - November 8, 2002
 Dez Leis para Ser Feliz (Ten Laws to be Happy) - February 2003
 Pais Brilhantes, Professores Fascinantes (Brilliant Parents, Fascinating Teachers) - September 2003
 Seja Líder de Si Mesmo (Be Your Own Leader) - October 2004
 Nunca Desista de Seus Sonhos (Never Give Up Your Dreams) - December 2004
A Ditadura da Beleza e a Revolução das Mulheres (The Dictatorship of Beauty and The Revolution of Women) - February 2005
 O Futuro da Humanidade (The future of The Humanity) - March 2005
 Collection Análise da Inteligência de Cristo (Analysis of Christ's Intelligence) - March 2006
O Mestre dos Mestres  (The Master of The Masters) vol. 1
O Mestre da Sensibilidade (The Master of Sensibility) vol. 2
O Mestre da Vida (The Master of Life) vol. 3
O Mestre do Amor  (The Master of Love) vol. 4
O Mestre Inesquecível (The Unforgettable Master) vol. 5
 Superando o Cárcere da Emoção (Overcoming The Prison of the Emotion) - December 2006
 Doze Semanas para Mudar uma Vida (Twelve Weeks to Change Your Life) - January 2007
 Os Segredos do Pai-Nosso (The Secrets of The Our Father) - February 2007
 Maria, a maior educadora da História (Mary, The Greatest Educator of History) - May 2007
 A Sabedoria Nossa de Cada Dia: Os Segredos do Pai-Nosso 2  (Our Daily Wisdom: The Secrets of Our Father 2) - May 2007
 Filhos Brilhantes, Alunos Fascinantes (Brilliant Sons, Fascinating Students) - September 2007
 Treinando a emoção para ser feliz (Training The Emotion to be Happy) - December 2007
 O Código da Inteligência (The Intelligence Code) - May 2008
 The Dreamseller Saga:
 O Vendedor de Sonhos: O Chamado (The Dreams Seller: the Calling) - December 2008
 O Vendedor de Sonhos e a Revolução dos Anônimos (The Dreams Seller: The Anonymous Revolution) - January 2009
 O vendedor de Sonhos: O Semeador de Ideias (The Dreamseller: Sower of Ideas) - 2009
 De Gênio e Louco todo Mundo tem um Pouco (Every Man Has a Genius in His Sleeve) - November 2009
 O Código Da Inteligência. Guia De Estudo (The Intelligence Code. Study Guide) - January 2009
 Mentes Brilhantes, Mentes Treinadas (Brilliant Minds, Trained Minds) - July 2010
 A fascinante construção do Eu (The Fascinating Construction of The Myself) - November 2010
 O Código da Inteligência E A Excelência Emocional (The Intelligence Code And The Emotional Excellence) - January 2011
 Mulheres Inteligentes, Relações Saudáveis (Intelligent Women, Healthfull Relations) - 2011
 O Colecionador de Lágrimas - Holocausto Nunca Mais (The Tears Colector: Holocaust No More) - 2012
 Manual para jovens estressados, mas muito inteligentes! (Manual to Stressed Young People, But Very Clever!) - 2012
 Armadilhas da mente (Mind's Traps) - September 2013
 Em busca do sentido da vida (Looking for the Sense of Life) - October 2013
 Ansiedade: Como Encarar o Mal do Século (Anxiety: How to Face The Evil of The Century) - December 2013
 Proteja sua emoção - Aprenda a ter a mente livre e saudável (Protect Your Happiness - Learn How to have a Free and Healthfull Mind) - 2014
 Controle o estresse - Saiba como encontrar equilíbrio (Control Your Stress - Know How to Have Balance) - 2014
 Vá mais longe - Treine sua memória e sua inteligência (Go Beyond - Train Your Memory And Your Intelligence) - 2014
 Sonhos e disciplina - Transforme seus projetos em realidade (Dreams and Discipline - Turn Your Projects in Reality) - 2014
 Pais Inteligentes formam sucessores, não herdeiros (Intelligent Parents Form Successors, Not Heirs) -  April 2014
 Bíblia King James Atualizada Freemind (King James Bible Freemind Atualized) - June 2014
 Felicidade roubada (Happiness Stolen) - 2014
 As Regras de Ouro dos Casais Saudáveis (The Golden Rules of The Healthfull Couples) - 2014
 Petrus Logus - O Guardião do Tempo (Petrus Logus - The Time Guardian) - October 2014
 Superação - Seja forte e resiliente e vença as dificuldades (Overcoming - Be Strong and Resilient and Win Your Difficulties) - 2015
 Autocontrole - Vença os fantasmas da emoção (Self Control - Overcome the Emotion's Ghost) - 2015
 Lidere sua mente - Seja autor(a) da própria história (Lead Your Mind - Be The Author of your Own History) - 2015
 Pais e filhos - Sem diálogo, as famílias morrem (Parents and Sons - Without Dialogue, The Families Die) - 2015
 Bons Profissionais e Excelentes Profissionais (Good Professionals and Excellent Professionals) - April de 2015
 Como Administrar Seu Intelecto (How to Administer Your Intellect) - April de 2015
 As Quatro Armadilhas da Mente e a Inteligência Multifocal (The Four Traps of The Mind and The Multifocal intelligence) - April de 2015
 Antiestresse Para Todos - Controlando A Ansiedade, Colorindo A Vida (Anti-Stress For Everyone - Controlling the Anxiety, Coloring the Life) - 2015
 Gestão da Emoção (Emotion's Management) - 2015
 Do Zero ao Gênio (From Zero to Genius) - December 2015
 O Médico da Humanidade  e A Cura da Corrupção (The Doctor of Humanity and the Cure for Corruption) - 2015
 Ansiedade - Como Enfrentar o Mal do Século Para Filhos e Alunos (Anxiety - How to Face The Century Evil, For Sons and Students) - 2015
 Ansiedade 2 - Autocontrole - Como Controlar o Estresse e Manter o Equilíbrio (Anxienty 2 - Selfcontrol - How to Control Stress and Keep The Balance) - 2016
 O Funcionamento da Mente (The operation of Mind) - 2016
 Ciúmes -  O medo da perda acelera a perda (Jealously - the Fear of Loss Accelerate The Loss) - 2016
 Petrus Logus - Os Inimigos da Humanidade (Petrus Logus - the Humanity's Enemies) - August 2016
 O homem mais inteligente da história (The Most Intelligent Man of History) - (latest) 2016

References

External links 

 Article from the Brazilian magazine 'Veja' about Augusto Cury
 Cury's Official Portuguese website
 CEAC Brasil (Centro de Estudos Augusto Cury – Brasilian Official Website)
 Simon and Schuster – US

1958 births
Living people
People from Colina, São Paulo
Brazilian people of Lebanese descent
Brazilian male writers
Brazilian fantasy writers
Portuguese-language writers